Ricardo Daniel Pepi (born January 9, 2003) is an American professional soccer player who plays as a striker for Eredivisie club FC Groningen, on loan from FC Augsburg, and the United States national team.

Early life
Pepi was born in El Paso, Texas, and raised in nearby San Elizario. He has Mexican ancestry through his family who were from Mexico, with Pepi regularly crossing the border to neighboring Ciudad Juárez to visit family. Pepi began playing recreational soccer when he was only four years old in local El Paso leagues. He soon began playing competitive organized soccer for a club coached by his dad, Daniel Pepi. The club would soon become affiliated with Major League Soccer club FC Dallas, who scouted Pepi following the Copa Chivas tournament in 2016, offering the then 13-year old the opportunity to join the FC Dallas youth academy.

In his first season, Pepi was put into the under-13 side and scored 18 goals in just 15 games, leading him to rise up the ranks within the club. He was soon promoted to the under-17 side as a 15-year old, scoring 19 goals in eight matches.

Club career

North Texas SC
On December 8, 2018, Pepi became the first signing for North Texas SC, the new affiliate club for FC Dallas' in USL League One. On March 30, 2019, Pepi made his professional debut in North Texas SC's first ever match, scoring a hat-trick in a 3–2 victory over the Chattanooga Red Wolves. Following the match, North Texas SC head coach Eric Quill stated: "I'd like to say that it shocks me, but it doesn't shock me. He's been in unbelievable form in the preseason. Every game, he's growing. He's got such a hunger to score goals, that is rare. He can finish in any way."

In the following match against Forward Madison, Pepi scored for the second match in a row deep into second half stoppage time to give North Texas SC the 1–0 home victory. He was then called into the international under-17 squad. When he returned, Pepi scored again in his third game of the season against Lansing Ignite in a 2–2 draw.

On October 12, 2019, Pepi returned to North Texas SC for the semifinals of the USL League One playoffs. He scored a brace for North Texas SC against Forward Madison in a 2–0 home victory, advancing the side to the final. After the match, Pepi was called into the under-17 side, thus not being available for selection against Greenville Triumph in the final on October 19. Despite his absence, North Texas SC proceeded to win the match 1–0 through Arturo Rodríguez, thus winning their first championship and giving Pepi his first trophy. Pepi was named as a finalist for the USL Young Player of the Year on October 17, but lost out to Arturo Rodríguez.

FC Dallas
On June 11, 2019, Pepi was loaned to North Texas SC parent club FC Dallas on a short-term loan ahead of their U.S. Open Cup match against OKC Energy. The next day, Pepi made his competitive debut for FC Dallas against OKC Energy, starting in the 4–0 victory at Toyota Stadium. He appeared again for FC Dallas in the next round on June 19, starting in the 2–1 defeat.

On June 21, 2019, Pepi was signed by FC Dallas to a homegrown player deal, becoming the club's fourth youngest academy signing at 16 years and 163 days old. The next day, on June 22, Pepi made his Major League Soccer debut, coming on as an 84th minute substitute in a 3–0 home victory over Toronto FC. He finished his first season with FC Dallas with nine appearances and 0 goals.

On March 7, 2020, Pepi scored his first professional goal for FC Dallas, a 96th-minute equalizer in a 2–2 draw against the Montreal Impact. He scored his second goal of the season on September 9 in a 3–2 defeat away against Minnesota United. On November 22, Pepi scored a very late equalizer for FC Dallas in second half stoppage time of the first round of the 2020 MLS Cup Playoffs against the Portland Timbers. The match would eventually be decided in a penalty shootout, with Pepi converting his penalty in the lead up to FC Dallas advancing 8–7.

2021 season
On April 17, Pepi made his first appearance of the 2021 season against the Colorado Rapids, coming on as an 81st minute substitute in the 0–0 draw. In the next match on April 24, Pepi scored his first goal of the season, a consolation for FC Dallas in a 3–1 away defeat against the San Jose Earthquakes. From that match on, Pepi would continue to feature as a regular starter for Luchi Gonzalez and on June 19, Pepi scored his second goal of the season against Minnesota United. His goal was an equalizer in a 1–1 draw. He then scored both goals for FC Dallas in a 2–1 victory against the New England Revolution on June 27.

On July 24, Pepi scored his first professional hat-trick in a 4–0 home victory against the LA Galaxy. The three goals in a single match made him the youngest player in Major League Soccer history to score a hat-trick. A week later, on August 4, it was announced that Pepi was selected by Bob Bradley to participate in the 2021 MLS All-Star Game against the Liga MX All-Stars. During the match on August 25, Pepi came on as a halftime substitute as the match ended 1–1 in regulation time, going into a penalty shootout. During the shootout, Pepi scored the winning goal for the Major League Soccer All-Stars to give the league a 3–2 victory.

In his next match, on August 29 against Austin FC, Pepi scored two goals for FC Dallas in a 5–3 away victory.

FC Augsburg 
On January 3, 2022, it was announced that Pepi had signed with FC Augsburg of the Bundesliga. The transfer fee was reported to be $20 million plus add-ons. The move made him the most expensive American MLS player to sign for a European club, the most expensive transfer by Augsburg, and the second most expensive player to transfer from MLS to a European league. He made his league debut for Augsburg on January 8, coming on in the 60th minute in a 3–1 defeat to Hoffenheim.

Loan to FC Groningen 
On September 1, 2022, it was announced that Pepi would go on a year-long loan to Eredivisie outfit FC Groningen for the duration of the 2022–23 season. In his competitive debut for the club against Cambuur he tallied an assist on the game's only goal. Pepi's hot start continued in the following match in which he broke an 11-month goal drought in a 2–1 defeat to Sparta Rotterdam. His most recent goal had come on October 7, 2021, in a 2–0 victory over Jamaica for the United States in World Cup qualifying, marking him just 20 days shy of a year without scoring a competitive goal. 

Following the September international break, Pepi notched his second goal in as many league games, scoring Groningen's only goal as they suffered a 4–1 defeat to AZ Alkmaar. The following week he scored a brace in a 3–2 defeat to RKC Waalwijk, in the process becoming the first Eredivisie player in the 21st century to score or assist on five goals in his first four league games. In a 3–0 victory over Excelsior on February 25, Pepi scored his tenth goal of his loan spell in just his 20th competitive game for Groningen.

Despite playing for a relegation-threatened side, Pepi earned a spot on the official Eredivisie Team of the Month for February 2023 as the only outfield player not from league powerhouses Ajax, PSV, and Feyenoord.

International career
Born in the United States, Pepi was eligible to play for both the United States and Mexico through his parents. He had also previously attended training camps for both the United States under-17 and Mexico under-17 sides. On April 22, 2019, Pepi was included in the United States under-17 squad by Raphaël Wicky for the CONCACAF U-17 Championship. On May 12, Pepi scored his first international goal against Panama, followed by a brace against Canada to help the United States advance to the final. In October 2019, Pepi was included again in the under-17 squad, this time for the FIFA U-17 World Cup.

On August 26, 2021, Pepi was included by Gregg Berhalter into the United States squad for 2022 FIFA World Cup qualification. On September 8, 2021, Pepi made his debut for the United States and scored the winning goal in a 4–1 away victory against Honduras. His goal was the second of the match, giving the United States a 2–1 lead. He scored twice in his second match, a 2–0 qualifying win against Jamaica played in Austin, Texas.

Pepi ultimately though was not called up to the team's 2022 World Cup roster.

Career statistics

Club

International 

As of match played February 2, 2022. United States score listed first, score column indicates score after each Pepi goal.

Honors
North Texas SC
USL League One Regular Season: 2019
USL League One Championship: 2019

Individual
MLS All-Star: 2021
MLS Young Player of the Year: 2021

References

External links
 Profile at FC Dallas

2003 births
Living people
American sportspeople of Mexican descent
Soccer players from El Paso, Texas
American soccer players
Association football defenders
North Texas SC players
FC Augsburg players
FC Groningen players
FC Dallas players
Bundesliga players
Eredivisie players
USL League One players
Major League Soccer players
American expatriate soccer players
Expatriate footballers in the Netherlands
American expatriate soccer players in Germany
American expatriate sportspeople in the Netherlands
Homegrown Players (MLS)
United States men's youth international soccer players
United States men's international soccer players